Peggy Armstrong may refer to:

Peggy Armstrong, fictional character in Heartbeat played by Gwen Taylor
Peggy Armstrong, fictional character in Tugboat Annie Sails Again

See also
Margaret Armstrong (disambiguation)